Chettiyakkapalayam is a village in Kinathukadavu Taluk in the Coimbatore district in the Indian state of Tamil Nadu.

Education

Engineering College 
 Arjun  College of Technology

Transport
Buses from Kinathukadavu To Periya Negamam

References

Villages in Coimbatore district